Anastasia and Arina Rodionova were the defending champions, having won the event in 2012, but Anastasia chose to compete at the 2013 Toray Pan Pacific Open and Arina decided not to participate.

Tamira Paszek and Coco Vandeweghe won the title, defeating Denise Muresan and Caitlin Whoriskey in the final, 6–4, 6–2.

Seeds

Draw

References 
 Draw

Party Rock Open - Doubles
2013 Party Rock Open
Party Rock Open